The following events occurred in September 1962:

September 1, 1962 (Saturday)
In a referendum in Singapore, voters overwhelmingly supported a proposition to merge with the Malayan Federation to become part of Malaysia, with limited autonomy. Out of 561,559 ballots cast, there were 397,626 in favor of making all Singapore residents Malaysian citizens, while allowing independence in matters of labor and education. Another 144,077 ballots were left blank as a protest.
Typhoon Wanda struck Hong Kong, killing 134 people and injuring more than 200.
A 7.1 magnitude earthquake in northwest Iran destroyed 91 villages and killed 12,225 people. The epicenter was near Buin Zahra in the Qazvin Province.
George W. Jeffs became Program Manager of the Paraglider Development Program at North American Aviation. He replaced N. F. Witte, who remained as Assistant Program Manager. This organizational change reflected the elevation of work on the Gemini paraglider from project to program status within North American's Space and Information Systems Division. The paraglider program achieved operating division status three months later when Jeffs was appointed Vice President of Space and Information Systems Division.
Died: Hans-Jürgen von Arnim, 73, former German military leader

September 2, 1962 (Sunday)
The Soviet Union announced that it had signed an agreement on military and industrial assistance with Cuba, following an August meeting in Yalta between Soviet premier Nikita Khrushchev and Cuban Economics Minister Che Guevara.
The United Kingdom approved the Malta Independence Act, providing that the British colony would become its own nation on September 21, 1964.
The 1962 UCI Road World Championships took place in Salò, Italy.
Bishop Tord Godal consecrated Nerskogen Chapel in Rennebu, Norway.
The fourth Taça Brasil football competition began in Brazil.
All non-military air travel in the United States and Canada was halted for five hours as part of "Exercise Sky Shield III".
Born: Prachya Pinkaew, Thai film director, producer and screenwriter; in Nakhon Ratchasima Province
Died: William R. Blair, Irish-born American physicist and inventor, most famous for the 1937 creation of the "Object Locating System" better known as radar. He was not allowed to apply for a patent until after World War II and was granted U.S. Patent No. 2,803,819 five years before his death.

September 3, 1962 (Monday)
Jens Otto Krag succeeded the ailing Viggo Kampmann as Prime Minister of Denmark.
Died: 
E. E. Cummings, 67, American poet and author, following a cerebral hemorrhage the night before. Edward Elstin Cummings had written his last words the afternoon before, about delphinium flowers, chopped some wood, sharpened the axe, then collapsed in his home. 
Franz Schrönghamer-Heimdal, 81, German Catholic, Nazi, and anti-Semitic author

September 4, 1962 (Tuesday)
The closing ceremony of the 1962 Asian Games was held in Jakarta, Indonesia, following an attack on India's embassy by 1,000 rioters. Earlier, Asian Games Federation Vice-President G. D. Sondhi had announced that he was seeking to have the executive council declare that the competition was not part of the name "Asian Games", because AGF members Israel and Nationalist China (Taiwan) had had their teams excluded.
The Beatles made their first recording of a song that would become a hit single, "Love Me Do". It would become their fourth #1 song in the United States, in 1964.
Gemini Project Office directed McDonnell to provide Gemini spacecraft No. 3 with rendezvous radar capability and to provide a rendezvous evaluation pod as a requirement for missions 2 and 3. Four pods were required: one prototype, two flight articles, and one flight spare.
Born:  
Patrice Lagisquet, French rugby player for the France national rugby union team, and assistant coach; in Arcachon, Gioronde département  
Ulla Tørnæs, Danish politician, Minister of Education 2001-2005, Minister for Development Cooperation 2016-2019; in Esbjerg

September 5, 1962 (Wednesday)
Gilbert Chandler became leader of the Victorian Legislative Council in Australia.
The U.S. National Park Service acquired "Cedar Hill", the home of Frederick Douglass, located at 1411 W Street S.E. in Washington, D.C., which became "the first black national historic site". On the same date, the Park Service acquired "Glenmont", the home (and laboratory) of Thomas Edison in West Orange, New Jersey.
The composition of the American penny was changed to 95% copper and 5% zinc, which remained until 1982, when pennies became 97.5% zinc and 2.5% copper.
For Project Gemini rendezvous missions, Manned Spacecraft Center intended to launch the Agena target vehicle first. If conditions were normal, the spacecraft would be launched the following day.

Sputnik 4, a Soviet mockup of a crewed spacecraft, fell out of orbit after 843 days, having been launched on May 15, 1960. What was believed to be a  fragment landed at the intersection of North 8th Street and Park Street in Manitowoc, Wisconsin, which was along the path where the craft disintegration took place.
Died: Sekarmadji Maridjan Kartosuwirjo, 57, Indonesian Islamic mystic and leader of the Darul Islam rebellion against the Sukarno regime, was executed by a firing squad

September 6, 1962 (Thursday)
Archaeologist Peter Marsden discovered the first of the "Blackfriars Ships" in London, buried in the mud of the Thames River and literally "under the shadow of Blackfriars Bridge". With a cofferdam to hold back the waters during low tide, and assistance from the London Fire Brigade, the oak craft was excavated. From pottery shards in the wreckage, Marsden estimated that the ship sank during the 2nd century AD, when the Roman Empire ruled Britain.
A study group formed at the Gemini mock-up review of August 15-16 met to review the ejection seat development program. McDonnell reported the successful completion of redesign and testing which cleared the way for resumption of off-the-pad developmental testing. McDonnell described the major outstanding design task as the determination of the dynamic center of gravity of the seat-man combination under expected acceleration profiles.

September 7, 1962 (Friday)
The world's first aquanaut, Robert Sténuit of Belgium, was brought back from the bottom of the Mediterranean Sea, where he had become the first person to spend 24 hours on the ocean floor. Sténuit, who was lowered off the coast of France near Cap Ferrat, stayed inside a pressurized airtight cylinder designed by Edwin Link.
Former French Prime Minister Georges Bidault, who had fled from France to Italy after being indicted for anti-government activities, was taken into custody at Rome and ordered to leave Italy, with transportation "to the frontier of his choice".
The Buckfastleigh, Totnes and South Devon Railway, in England, was closed by the Western Region of British Railways.
The results of a joint study by the U.S. Atomic Energy Commission, the U.S. Department of Defense, and NASA concerning the possible harmful effects of the artificial radiation belt created by Operation Dominic on Project Mercury's flight MA-8 were announced. The study predicted that radiation on the outside of the capsule during astronaut Walter M. Schirra's six-orbit flight would be about 500 roentgens but that shielding, vehicle structures, and flight suit would reduce this dosage down to about 8 roentgens on the astronaut's skin. This exposure, well below the tolerance limits previously established, would not necessitate any change of plans for the MA-8 flight.
Filming of Sergei Bondarchuk's War and Peace began, and would continue for another six years.
Died:  
Karen Blixen, 77, Danish author known by her pen name of Isak Dinesen. As Dinesen, she wrote the memoir Out of Africa in 1937, which would become the basis for the 1985 film of the same name. 
Morris Louis, 49, American painter, died of lung cancer from prolonged exposure to toxic paint fumes

September 8, 1962 (Saturday)
In the Sino-Indian War, two companies of Communist Chinese troops crossed the McMahon Line that had marked the border between India and China, to confront soldiers at the recently established Indian Army border post at Dhola.
The Cuban Missile Crisis began as the first consignment of Soviet R-12 (called SS-4 by NATO) offensive missiles arrived in Cuba, on board the freighter Omsk. The medium range ballistic missiles, which could be fitted with nuclear warheads and could strike targets in the U.S. within 2,000 km or 1,300 miles of Cuba.
Atlas launch vehicle 113-D for the Mercury-Atlas 8 (MA-8) crewed orbital mission was static-fired at Cape Canaveral. This test was conducted to check modifications that had been made to the booster for the purpose of smoother engine combustion.

September 9, 1962 (Sunday)
While India's Prime Minister Jawaharlal Nehru was out of the country for the Commonwealth Prime Ministers' Conference in London, Defence Minister V. K. Krishna Menon gave the order for the Indian Army to "evict" Chinese troops from south of the McMahon Line, even though there were Indian troops north of the line in China. The decision proved to be a disaster.
For the first time since Taiwan began U-2 overflights over Mainland China in January, one of the pilots of the Black Cat Squadron, the 35th Reconnaissance Squadron of the Republic of China Air Force, was shot down. Colonel Chen Huai-seng's U-2 plane was struck by an SA-2 Guideline missile near Nanchang, and Colonel Chen did not survive the crash. Another of the Black Cats, Major Wang Cheng-wen, was killed on the same day in an unrelated accidental crash of his U-2 plane.
Pravda, the Soviet Communist Party newspaper, published the article "Plans, Profits, and Bonuses", by economics professor Evsei Liberman of the Kharkiv National University of Economics, as the Communist Party introduced discussion of new policies that would become a reality in the 1965 Soviet economic reform. Liberman's proposal was to depart from the Communist system, of measuring factory efficiency by whether a pre-set production quota had been met, and judging performance instead by the amount of the factories' profit, with the goal of increasing the quality and quantity of products.
Jack Nicklaus won the first "World Series of Golf", a made-for-television exhibition organized by the NBC television network as a competition between the champions of the four major professional golf tournaments.  With a 138 on 36 holes, Nicklaus (winner of the U.S. Open) won the $50,000 first prize by finishing four strokes ahead of ahead of Masters and British Open champion Arnold Palmer and PGA Championship winner Gary Player, who tied at 139.  
Born:  
Liza Marklund, Swedish journalist and crime writer; in Pålmark 
Jack Trudeau, American football player and radio announcer; in Forest Lake, Minnesota
Died: Paavo Aaltonen, 42, Finnish gymnast and a winner of three gold medals in the 1948 Olympics

September 10, 1962 (Monday)
The railroad line between Taunton and Chard Junction, within Somerset, became the first casualty of the "Beeching cuts" after the Chairman of British Railways, Richard Beeching, began shutting down unprofitable railroad lines. For the next 13 years, passenger service would be halted permanently at 29 separate rail routes, a process accelerated after the publishing of the "Beeching Report" on March 27, 1963. An author would note later that the closures would eliminate  of routes, 2,500 stations, and 67,700 jobs.

Rod Laver of Australia became only the second person in history to win the "Grand Slam" of tennis, after taking the men's singles title in the U.S. Open, by defeating fellow Queenslander Roy Emerson, 6-2, 6-4, 5-7 and 6-4. Earlier in 1962, he won the Australian Open (January), the French Open (June) and Wimbledon (July).
Speaking for the U.S. Supreme Court, Justice Hugo Black halted further stays against enforcement of a lower court decision and ordered the immediate admission of James Meredith as the first African-American student at the then-segregated University of Mississippi. Black wrote that the enrollment of Meredith as a student "can do no appreciable harm to the university".
The Mercury-Atlas 8 (MA-8) crewed orbital mission was postponed and rescheduled for September 28, 1962, to allow additional time for flight preparation.
Born: Co Stompé, Dutch darts player and 2010 World Cup of Darts champion; in Amsterdam

September 11, 1962 (Tuesday)
Weeks before the discovery of nuclear missiles that would lead to the Cuban Missile Crisis, the Soviet Union publicly warned that a U.S. attack on Cuba, or on Soviet ships carrying supplies to the island, would mean war. In a statement read at the Foreign Office in Moscow, the government declared, "One cannot now attack Cuba and expect that the aggressor will be free from punishment for this attack. If such an attack is made, this will be the beginning of unleashing war... which might plunge the world into the disaster of a universal world war with the use of thermonuclear weapons."
Thurgood Marshall was confirmed by the U.S. Senate as a judge on the U.S. Court of Appeals for the Second Circuit, 353 days after he had been nominated, by a vote of 56-14. Marshall, an African-American who had argued the landmark case of Brown v. Board of Education, and who would later be elevated to the U.S. Supreme Court, had been serving for eleven months after President Kennedy had made an appointment, subject to Senate approval, while Congress was not in session.
Manned Spacecraft Center (MSC) aerospace technologists William G. Davis and Robert L. Turner compiled a description of scientific and support instrumentation that would be required aboard a crewed space station. Such equipment comprised basically three areas: (1) support and laboratory instrumentation, including those systems required for crew safety and scientific experiments; (2) scientific instrumentation, primarily for study of a true space environment on different spacecraft systems and materials and for advancement of scientific knowledge of space; and (3) the power system for a space station (wherein the pair compared the relative merits of 400-cycle alternating current versus 28-volt direct current power sources).
Big Sur, by Jack Kerouac, was first published.
Died: Robert Soblen, 61, an American spy who had been awaiting extradition to the United States to begin a life sentence in prison on conviction of espionage for the Soviet Union, died five days after he lapsed into a coma from a barbiturate overdose. Minutes before he was to board Pan Am Flight 101 from London to New York, Soblen collapsed at the London Airport (now called Heathrow). Although suicide was an obvious motive, investigators speculated that Soblen may have been poisoned by the Soviet KGB in order to prevent him from revealing the identities of other spies.

September 12, 1962 (Wednesday)
The 1962 European Athletics Championships opened at the Partizan Stadium in Belgrade.
U.S. President John F. Kennedy, in a speech at the football stadium of Rice University in Houston, reaffirmed that the U.S. would put a man on the Moon by the end of the decade. On hand were 40,000 people, mostly students. Kennedy had declared, on May 25, 1961, his belief that the nation should commit to a crewed moon landing, which would be achieved on July 20, 1969.
President Kennedy visited the Manned Spacecraft Center and was shown exhibits including Mercury, Gemini, and Apollo spacecraft hardware.
NASA announced it would launch a special satellite before the end of the year "to obtain information on possible effects of radiation on future satellites and to give the world's scientific community additional data on the artificial environment created by the radiation belt." The  satellite would be launched from Cape Canaveral into an elliptical orbit ranging from about  perigee to  apogee.
The first "mystery" satellite in the history of space exploration was launched, according to British magazine Flight International. The satellite was listed as belonging to the U.S. Air Force, but a spokesman said this was a "scientific guess based on our assessment of previous satellite launchings." Launching was not confirmed, and no official U.S. listing included such a satellite.
Simulated off-the-pad tests of the redesigned Gemini escape system resumed with test No. 6. Test No. 7 followed on September 20. Though primarily successful, these tests revealed some problems. The seat-structure thrust pad required reanalysis and redesign. Simulated off-the-pad testing was temporarily halted until a final configuration rocket catapult became available. A rocket motor test on January 4, 1963, demonstrated the structural integrity of the thrust-pad area, and simulated pad ejection tests resumed the following month.

September 13, 1962 (Thursday)
Governor of Mississippi Ross Barnett delivered a 20-minute address on statewide television and radio to urge state officials not to obey the federal court order to integrate the University of Mississippi, signing a legal document to implement the legal doctrine of interposition, whereby state law superseded a contrary federal government action. The Governor declared, "We will not drink from the cup of genocide. There is no case in history where the Caucasian race has survived integration." Barnett then made a proclamation, saying "I hereby direct each official to uphold and enforce the laws duly and legally enacted by the legislature of the State of Mississippi, regardless of this unwarranted, illegal and arbitrary usurpation of power," and added, "There is no cause which is more moral and just than the protection of the integrity of our races."
In elections in Grenada for the 15-member Legislative Council of the British Crown Colony, Chief Minister Herbert Blaize's Grenada National Party won six of the ten elected seats.

September 14, 1962 (Friday)
Frederick S. Modise, a minister of South Africa's Zion Christian Church, was inspired to form a separate Christian denomination while in the Coronation Hospital in Johannesburg for what was diagnosed as an incurable illness. Modise, who would found the International Pentecost Holiness Church of South Africa, would say later that a voice had told him that he would be healed and would be able to return home on October 3. For the remainder of his life, Reverend Modise would minister to other ill patients.
Teledu Cymru (now Wales West and North Television) began broadcasting to the North and West Wales region of Britain, extending the ITV Network to the whole of the United Kingdom. Transmitters were located at Pembroke, Caernarvon and Flint.
A coordination meeting on mission planning and guidance defined the first Gemini mission as a spacecraft maximum-heating-rate test. As many spacecraft systems as possible were to be tested, to allow the second flight to be crewed.
Died: William Lindsay Gresham, 53, American novelist and non-fiction author, took an overdose of sleeping pills after having been diagnosed with incurable cancer.

September 15, 1962 (Saturday)
The first Soviet medium-range missiles were deployed in Cuba, a week after their arrival. On the same day, American electronic intelligence detected that Soviet high-altitude surface-to-air missiles had become operational. An SA-2 (or S-75) Dvina missile had downed the U-2 spy plane flown by Francis Gary Powers in 1960, and the weapons, located near the port of Mariel, were capable of stopping further American attempts to verify a missile buildup.
Iran's foreign minister Abbas Aram, and Soviet Union Ambassador Nikolai Pegov, signed an agreement providing that Iran would not allow any foreign nation to set up rocket bases on its soil.
Died: William Coblentz, 88, American physicist

September 16, 1962 (Sunday)
British driver Graham Hill won the Italian Grand Prix, held at Monza.
The first semiconductor laser began operation, using a gallium arsenide compound. The initial test was done by Gunter Fenner at the General Electric Research Laboratory in Schenectady, New York.
Born:
Joanne Catherall, English vocalist for The Human League; in Sheffield, South Yorkshire
Josephus Thimister, Belgian designer; in Maastricht (d. 2019)

September 17, 1962 (Monday)

The final prototype of the Mil Mi-8 helicopter, with 1,500 shaft horsepower engines, was given its initial test flight. The Soviet, and later Russian-built, machine would sell more units than any other helicopter in history.
Khalid al-Azm became Prime Minister of Syria for the sixth (and last) time, succeeding Bashir al-Azma. The Ba'ath Party would overthrow the Syrian government on March 8, 1963, and al-Azm would be arrested.
BBC Wales Today was broadcast for the first time. As of September 17, 2022, it had been on the air for sixty years as one of the world's longest-running daily television news programmes.
At a press conference at the University of Houston's Cullen Auditorium, Director Robert R. Gilruth of Manned Spacecraft Center (MSC) introduced nine new American astronauts, officially members of NASA Astronaut Group 2, who had been selected for the MSC flight crew training program for Gemini and Apollo flights. Of the nine, four were from the Air Force, three were from the Navy, and two were civilians. The "New Nine" were Neil Armstrong (civilian), Frank Borman (Air Force), Pete Conrad (Navy), Jim Lovell (Navy), James McDivitt (Air Force), Elliot See (civilian), Thomas P. Stafford (Air Force), Ed White (Air Force) and John Young (Navy). Armstrong would become the first man to walk on the Moon (Conrad would be third and Young ninth). Borman and Lovell would orbit the Moon; White would be the first American to "walk in space" but would die in the fire of Apollo 1; Young would command the space shuttle's first launched mission; and See would die in a plane crash before he could fly in space.
Studies completed by the Navy Biophysics Branch of the Navy School of Aviation Medicine, Pensacola, Florida, disclosed that astronaut John Glenn had received less than one-half the cosmic radiation dosage expected during his orbital flight. The Mercury-Atlas 6 (MA-6) spacecraft walls had served as excellent protection.
Born:  
Paul Feig, American TV director and actor; in Royal Oak, Michigan
BeBe Winans (stage name for Benjamin Winans), American gospel singer and brother of CeCe Winans; in Detroit

September 18, 1962 (Tuesday)
U.S. Marine Corps helicopters flew a combat mission from Da Nang, South Vietnam, for the first time, airlifting South Vietnamese troops into the hills south of Da Nang.
Donald Slayton, one of the seven chosen for the Mercury astronaut training program, was designated Coordinator of Astronaut Activities at the Manned Spacecraft Center.
The NASA spacecraft test conductor and the Convair test conductor notified the interface committee chairman of the readiness-for-mate of the adapter-interface area of the Mercury-Atlas 8 (MA-8).
Died: Therese Neumann, 64, German Catholic mystic and stigmatic. Her followers said that she had inedia, the ability to survive without food, and that she had stopped eating in 1926.

September 19, 1962 (Wednesday)

Prince Saif Al-Islam Muhammad al-Badr became the new Imam of Yemen, following the death of his 71-year-old father, Imam Ahmad bin Yahya, who was described at his death as "despotic", "the perennial target of assassins", and a man "said to have died from natural causes hastened by old wounds". The following day, al-Badr was proclaimed at the Imam Al-Mansoor Billah. His reign would last for a week before he was overthrown.
The United States Intelligence Board reviewed all available data on arms shipments to Cuba and reported to President Kennedy (erroneously) that there was no basis for speculation that nuclear missiles would be placed on the Caribbean island.
ACF Electronics delivered an engineering prototype radar beacon to McDonnell for Project Gemini. An engineering prototype C-band beacon had operated at ACF Electronics under simulated reentry conditions with no degradation in performance.
Life Systems Division reported on continuing studies related to extravehicular operations during Gemini missions. These included evaluation of a superinsulation coverall, worn over the pressure suit, for thermal protection; ventilation system requirements and hardware; and methods of maneuvering in proximity to the spacecraft.

A full-scale mockup of the Boeing X-20 Dyna-Soar spaceplane was unveiled for reporters in Las Vegas, where the Air Force Association was holding its annual convention, and the six pilots who would be the first to fly the X-20 were introduced. "Technical men familiar with sketches and photographs of the X-20 were startled by the vicious ugliness" of the plane, the Associated Press reported, noting that "With its upturned wingtips and long snout, the X-20 looks like its designer had somehow managed to cross a manta ray with a shark." The Dyna-Soar project, scheduled for a 1965 launch, would be cancelled after cost overruns, and none were ever built.
The first episode of The Virginian, starring James Drury in the title role (the character's real name was never revealed), was shown on NBC as the first 90-minute weekly TV series. It would run nine seasons, ending in 1971.
Died: Nikolai Pogodin, 61, Soviet playwright

September 20, 1962 (Thursday)
Escorted by federal marshals James Meredith arrived at Oxford, Mississippi, in order to become the first African-American to enroll at the University of Mississippi. Governor Ross Barnett personally blocked Meredith's entrance into the admissions building.
Voting was conducted for Algeria's first Constituent Assembly since the nation's independence, with voters being given a choice of "yes" or "no" for the 196 candidates from the National Liberation Front, led by Ahmed Ben Bella.

The MGB sports car was introduced by MG Cars. Over the next 18 years, 500,000 MGBs would be sold, making it the best selling sports car in history.
Died:  
Robert Colquhoun, 47, Scottish painter, printmaker and theatre set designer 
Conrad Emil Lambert Helfrich, 75, Dutch naval commander of World War II

September 21, 1962 (Friday)
Composer Igor Stravinsky returned to Russia after an absence of 48 years, as a guest of the Soviet Union.
The UN General Assembly approved a ceasefire agreement between Indonesia and the Netherlands, with UN military observers from six nations monitoring the agreement. A larger UN Security Force would arrive at West Irian on October 3.
The British music magazine New Musical Express published a story about two 13-year-old schoolgirls, "Sue" and "Mary", releasing a disc on Decca, and added that "A Liverpool group, The Beatles, have recorded 'Love Me Do' for Parlophone Records, set for October 5 release."         
Born: Rob Morrow, American TV actor known for Northern Exposure and Numb3rs; in New Rochelle, New York
Died: Marie Bonaparte, 80, French author and psychoanalyst

September 22, 1962 (Saturday)
India's Defence Ministry officials met to discuss plans to drive out Chinese troops from the disputed border area at Thang La ridge. Despite the argument by General P.N. Thaper, the Chief of the Army Staff of Indian Army, that Chinese troops at the border outnumbered those from India, General Thaper was given a written order to "prepare and throw out the Chinese as soon as possible".
Travel time between the two Italian cities was cut almost in half, from 3 1/2 hours to two hours.
As an experiment, Walter Schirra planned to carry a special  hand camera aboard the Mercury-Atlas 8 (MA-8) spacecraft. During the flight, the astronaut would attempt to arrive at techniques that could be applied to an advanced Nimbus weather satellite.
Born: Sirous Ghayeghran, Iranian footballer and captain of the national team, with 43 appearances from 1986 to 1993; in Bandar Anzali (died 1998)

September 23, 1962 (Sunday)

The Jetsons - George, Jane, Judy and Elroy - were introduced in a primetime cartoon of the same name at 7:30 pm Eastern time on the ABC television network. Despite having only 24 episodes, the science fiction show, about a family living about 100 years in the future, would be rerun for 23 years until new episodes were commissioned for a syndicated revival in 1985.
The Lincoln Center for the Performing Arts, including its modern Philharmonic Hall, later Avery Fisher Hall, opened in New York City. The inaugural concert, which was televised live on CBS, featured Leonard Bernstein, the New York Philharmonic Orchestra, and a host of operatic stars such as Eileen Farrell and Robert Merrill.
Unbeknownst to the world, Pope John XXIII was diagnosed with terminal stomach cancer.  He would pass away on June 3, 1963.
The Soviet Union Council of Ministers approved the development of the Global Rocket 1 (GR-1) missile, with the goal of a weapon with a range of 20,000 km or 12,500 miles, capable of hitting a target anywhere on Earth. The project was cancelled in 1964 in favor of the R-36 orbiting missile, designated as the SS-18 by NATO.
Flying Tiger Line Flight 923 crashed into the Atlantic Ocean after three of its four engines failed. The L-1049H Super Constellation was on its way from the United States to West Germany when it ditched at sea with 76 people on board, of whom 28 died. The other 48 were rescued by the Swiss ship Celerina. The crash investigation determined that the accident was caused by the failure of engine No. 3, the accidental closing of a shutoff valve on engine No. 1 by the flight engineer, and the failure of engine No. 2 as the plane was proceeding to the nearest available airport.   
Born: Robert Molle, Canadian athlete who won a silver Olympic medal in wrestling in 1984, and later captained the Winnipeg Blue Bombers of the Canadian Football League; in Saskatoon

September 24, 1962 (Monday)
Samuel Barber's Piano Concerto, performed by John Browning, premiered at the Philharmonic Hall.
Born:  
Ally McCoist, Scottish footballer, manager and television personality; in Bellshill, North Lanarkshire 
Sergey Schepkin, Russian pianist, in Leningrad (now Saint Petersburg), Russian SFSR, Soviet Union

September 25, 1962 (Tuesday)
In Yemen, Abdullah as-Sallal launched a coup d'état aimed at the overthrow of the new Imam, Muhammad al-Badr. Sallal's troops shelled the royal palace, thought they had buried the Imam in the rubble, and proclaimed his death on Aden radio. But al-Badr had escaped and would attempt a rebellion against the newly proclaimed government.
The new Constitutional Assembly elected Ferhat Abbas the President of Algeria and formally proclaimed the foundation of the Democratic and Popular Republic of Algeria during their opening session.
A preliminary design criteria review conference for complex 14, held in Los Angeles, resulted in ground rules for all contractors. Target dates established were (1) stand availability, July 1, 1963; (2) estimated beneficial occupancy date, November 1, 1963; and (3) vehicle on-stand date, February 1, 1964. Complex 14 would be used for launching the Gemini-Agena target vehicle and Mariner spacecraft, but basic modifications would be primarily for the Gemini program. On November 15, 1962, Air Force Space Systems Division reviewed the criteria summary report for complex 14 modifications and suggested only minor engineering changes.
Sonny Liston and Floyd Patterson fought for the world heavyweight boxing title in Chicago. Liston made history by being the first man ever to knock out a reigning heavyweight champion in the first round, downing the titleholder in 2 minutes and 6 seconds.

September 26, 1962 (Wednesday)

The Beverly Hillbillies, a television situation comedy about a poor Ozark Mountain family who became multi-millionaires after oil was found on their land, began a nine-year run on the CBS network, with the first episode premiering at 9:00 pm Eastern time.  UPI television critic Rick Du Brow wrote the next day that the series "is going to be a smash hit" in that it was similar in premise to TV program The Real McCoys, but added that "The nicest thing I can say... is that it is really not like 'The Real McCoys'... The McCoys are a civilized rural clan; these new hillbillies make L'il Abner and his mob look like a bunch of sophisticates."  Within three weeks, it was the most-watched series on American television, and stayed at #1 in its first two seasons. The show had 274 episodes, with the final one broadcast on March 23, 1971.
A flash flood killed 445 people, in Barcelona and in the nearby villages of Sabadell and Terrassa in the Catalan region of Spain.
As the North Yemen Civil War progressed, all areas of the Yemeni city of San'a were in the hands of the new Yemen government, led by Abdullah as-Sallal, and he proclaimed the Yemen Arab Republic.
Restaurant entrepreneur Harland Sanders filed a patent application for his invention, a "process of producing fried chicken under pressure", describing a system using a pressure cooker with the object "to provide a novel process for quickly and thoroughly frying chicken under pressure in a manner to seal in substantially all the natural juices while browning the breaded surface thereof to desired crispness and appearance."  U.S. Patent No. 3,245,800 would be granted on April 12, 1966, and was assigned by Sanders to the Kentucky Fried Chicken Corporation.
Born:  
Chunky Panday (stage name for Suyash Panday), Indian film actor; in Bombay (now Mumbai)
Mark Haddon, English author of children's books; in Northampton

September 27, 1962 (Thursday)
Rachel Carson's book Silent Spring was released, giving rise to the modern environmentalist movement.
The 25th Canadian Parliament opened its first and only session, adjourning on February 6, 1963.

September 28, 1962 (Friday)
Yemeni radio announced the death of former ruler, Muhammad al-Badr. Al-Badr had, in fact, escaped the country and was living in Saudi Arabia.
Prime Minister Ahmed Ben Bella founded the first government of independent Algeria.
Walter Schirra made a 6.5-hour simulated flight in the Mercury-Atlas 8 (MA-8) spacecraft. The worldwide tracking network of 21 ground stations and ships also participated in the exercise.
A meeting to discuss space-station-related work during 1963 was held in Washington, D.C., between people from the Office of Manned Space Flight (OMSF), the Office of Advanced Research and Technology (OART), and the three Centers most involved in such work, MSC, Marshall Space Flight Center (MSFC), and Langley Research Center (LaRC). Although the timing for a space station project was far from firm, all agreed that the concept was important, and that advanced technological work must proceed at the Centers in order to present top management with information on such a program when appropriate. Douglas Lord of OMSF noted that funding for space station research and study contracts was limited because of an "understandable preoccupation" with the Apollo program, noting that for 1963 OMSF was allowing $2.2 million to MSC and $300 000 to MSFC for contractor-related studies, compared to DART's funding to LaRC of $800,000. Maxime A. Faget stated that MSC was revising some of its earlier plans for space station studies to include a thorough operational analysis so that rational cost-based decisions could be made in 1964. He observed that cost would be a very important-if not the most important-factor in any early space station program decision, thus dictating a simple design for the vehicle. Clint Brown, representing Langley, agreed with Faget's views and announced that LaRC had reorganized its original space station steering group and had reoriented and broadened their conceptual design studies, with greater emphasis upon simplicity of configuration and system design. Although Brown and Faget disagreed on the principal justification for a space station program (Faget viewed it as a support for a future human flight to Mars, while Brown argued primarily its usefulness as a research laboratory for a variety of NASA research elements), both agreed on the desirability of bringing all of the Agency's Program Offices (such as the Office of Space Science and Applications) into the planning picture. All the participants at this meeting agreed that a paramount objective for immediate planning was to define program objectives for a space station-what roles it would fill and what purposes it would be designed to accomplish.
Born: Fred Merkel, American motorcycle racing champion; in Stockton, California

September 29, 1962 (Saturday)

The Canadian Alouette 1, the first satellite built outside the United States and the Soviet Union, was launched from Vandenberg AFB in California.
My Fair Lady ended its Broadway run after more than six years and 2,717 performances, a Broadway record that would stand until surpassed later by Hello, Dolly!
In order to prevent the University of Mississippi from making any further efforts to prevent James Meredith from becoming the first African-American to enroll there, President Kennedy issued a proclamation commanding all persons engaged in the obstruction of the laws and the orders of the courts to "cease and desist therefrom and to disperse and retire peaceably forthwith", citing his authority under 10 U.S.C. § 332, § 333, and § 334 to use the militia or the armed forces to suppress any insurrection, domestic violence, unlawful combination, or conspiracy."
Reconnaissance aircraft indicated the formation of a tropical depression to the east of the Lesser Antilles, which would later develop into Hurricane Daisy.
Died: Muhammad VIII al-Amin, 85, last Bey of Tunisia, who reigned from 1943 to 1957 before the abolition of the monarchy.

September 30, 1962 (Sunday)
James Meredith was escorted by a team of United States Marshals to the campus of the University of Mississippi for enrollment as the first African-American student at "Ole Miss". That evening, at 8:15 pm, rioting broke out as a mob joined students on the campus, and the 4,000 troops of the 108th Armored Cavalry Regiment of the Mississippi National Guard was "federalized" under the command of Brigadier General Charles Billingslea of the U.S. Army to restore order, taking the side of the United States against the State of Mississippi. Two civilians were killed by unknown persons, which many believed to be rioters. Paul Guihard, a British reporter on assignment for the Agence France-Presse, was shot in the back, and a local jukebox repairman, George Gunter, was shot in the head while visiting the situation out of curiosity.
The CBS Radio Network  broadcast the final episodes of Suspense and Yours Truly, Johnny Dollar, marking the end of the Golden Age of Radio.
In the final scheduled games of the 1962 Major League Baseball season, the San Francisco Giants (100-61) defeated the Houston Colt .45s, 2-1, while the Los Angeles Dodgers (101-60) lost to the St. Louis Cardinals, 1-0, giving both the Giants and Dodgers identical 101-61 records and first place in the National League, and forcing a playoff series between the two.    The Dodgers, who had had a two-game lead with only four games left in the season, went on to lose the playoff to the Giants, who would go on to the 1962 World Series.
The National Farm Workers of America, which would later merge with the Agricultural Workers Organizing Committee to form the United Farm Workers of America, was founded in Fresno, California by Cesar Chavez.

References

1962
1962-09
1962-09